"Allez Ola Olé" (Come on! Ola! Olé!) is a song in the French language performed by Jessy Matador that represented France at the Eurovision Song Contest 2010. The song was chosen internally, and was announced 24 February 2010. The song was to be used by French broadcaster France Télévisions as The Summerhit of 2010 and also for promoting the 2010 FIFA World Cup, and the title of the song refers to the album Music of the World Cup: Allez! Ola! Ole!, released in 1998 to coincide with the '98 World Cup, held in France.

Matador was selected internally by France Télévisions to represent France at the contest, and announced as the selected artist on 19 February 2010, after rumours of Christophe Willem, David Guetta and Emmanuel Moire being selected for the role. On 24 February Matador's song was announced, and was released online on 10 May. As of June 2020, it has over 61 million views on YouTube, making it one of the most-viewed videos on the official Eurovision channel.

Track listings
Digital download
"Radio Edit" – 2:52
"Radio Edit Electro" – 3:14

German CD single
"Radio Edit" – 2:52
"Radio Edit Electro" – 3:14
"Video Clip" – 3:24

French Promo CD single
"Kework & Cocozza Remix" – 4:24
"Afro Mix" – 4:01
"Techno Mix" – 3:47
"Radio Edit" – 2:52
"Radio Edit Electro" – 3:14

Chart performance

Year-end charts

Release history

External links
 Official music video at YouTube
 Eurovision profile, lyrics and translation at Eurovision.tv

References

Eurovision songs of 2010
Eurovision songs of France
2010 singles
SNEP Top Singles number-one singles
Football songs and chants
Jessy Matador songs
2010 songs
Wagram Music singles